Jiang Weixin (Chinese: 姜伟新; born January 1949) is the former Minister of Housing and Urban-Rural Construction of the People's Republic of China (MOHURD).

Jiang was born in Fuyu County, Heilongjiang, and graduated from Peking University. He joined the Chinese Communist Party in December 1969. He served in the National Development and Reform Commission for many years. He was a member of the 17th Central Committee of the Chinese Communist Party.

External links
 Jiang Weixin's profile at the official website of the MOHURD

1949 births
People's Republic of China politicians from Heilongjiang
Living people
Chinese Communist Party politicians from Heilongjiang
People from Qiqihar